Johanna Götesson (born 3 July 1985) is a Swedish former competitive figure skater. She is the 2003 Nordic bronze medalist and 2004 Swedish national champion. She placed 29th at the 2003 World Championships and 35th at the 2001 World Junior Championships.

Programs

Competitive highlights 
JGP: Junior Grand Prix

References

External links 
 
 Tracings.net profile

1985 births
Living people
People from Tibro Municipality
Swedish female single skaters
Sportspeople from Västra Götaland County
21st-century Swedish women